Mehndi is a 1998 Bollywood drama film, written and directed by Hamid Ali Khan. It stars Rani Mukerji and Faraaz Khan. Dialogues were written by Iqbal Durrani.

Plot
Pooja is Niranjan's new wife. She comes from a middle-class family. The first days pass happily. Niranjan decides to launch a factory and asks money from his father-in-law. But Pooja opposes the will. It reveals that Niranjan is in the habit of visiting brothels. His other family members regularly torture Pooja, Her mother-in-law curses Pooja saying her son faces hardships due to her. Niranjan is arrested by the police on the charge of murder and sentenced to death. That night a mysterious man visits their house and says he will stop Niranjan's hanging only if Pooja agrees to spend a night with him. To save her husband's life, Pooja unwillingly agrees but the man does nothing with her. Niranjan is released from jail and his mother turns him against Pooja. Niranjan and his family expel Pooja from the house, calling her "characterless" for spending the night with the unknown man. Thereafter Pooja's divorce case goes to the court. Her in-laws even insult her father and sister. Pooja's father is murdered by Pooja's sister-in-law's husband in the court. Pooja and her sister are distraught. She circles her father's funeral pyre and vows to destroy the home which destroyed her life. She provokes her sister-in-law's husband in court and he tries to shoot her but she kills him. Pooja gradually destroys her in-laws. Niranjan and his family try to burn Pooja alive but Pooja saves herself and shoots Niranjan. Her in-laws and a dying Niranjan ask her for forgiveness. The movie ends on a happy note.

Cast
 Rani Mukerji as Advocate Pooja Chaudhary 
 Faraaz Khan as Niranjan Chaudhary
 Shakti Kapoor as Banne Miyaan
 Pramod Moutho as Mr. Chaudhary
 Himani Shivpuri as Mrs. Chaudhary
 Mahavir Shah as Ankush Choudhary 
 Arjun as Biloo
 Shahbaz Khan as Rajeshwar
 Asrani as Tolanii
 Yunus Parvez as Judge
 Gulshan Grover as Sikh Truck Driver
 Raza Murad as Sethji
 Mary Gul Khan as Marjaan

Soundtrack

External links

References

1998 films
1990s Hindi-language films
Indian drama films
Films scored by Babul Bose